Petri Koivisto (born November 15, 1986) is a Finnish ice hockey goaltender who currently plays professionally in Finland for Espoo Blues of the SM-liiga.

References

External links

1986 births
Living people
Espoo Blues players
Oulun Kärpät players
People from Kiiminki
Finnish ice hockey goaltenders
Sportspeople from North Ostrobothnia